Karatal (Qaratal) is a rural locality (a village) in Akmurunsky Selsoviet, Baymaksky District, Bashkortostan, Russia. The population was 512 as of 2010. There are 4 streets.

Geography 
Karatal is located 19 km northwest of Baymak (the district's administrative centre) by road. Buranbayevo is the nearest rural locality.

References 

Rural localities in Baymaksky District